Patty Kim has been the representative of the 103rd district since 2013. The 103rd Pennsylvania House of Representatives District is located in Dauphin County and includes the following areas:

 Harrisburg
 Highspire
 Paxtang
 Steelton
 Swatara Township (PART)
 District 01 
 District 03

Recent election results

References

Government of Dauphin County, Pennsylvania
103